Stefan Pettersson may refer to:
Stefan Pettersson (footballer), Swedish football player
Stefan Pettersson (ice hockey), Swedish ice hockey player